Qeshlaq-e Qarah Kakil Hajji Mahmud (also Romanized as Qeshlāq-e Qarah Kakīl Ḩājjī Maḩmūd) is a village in Qeshlaq-e Jonubi Rural District, Qeshlaq Dasht District, Bileh Savar County, Ardabil Province, Iran. At the 2006 census, the village's population was 34, in 6 families.

References 

Populated places in Bileh Savar County
Towns and villages in Bileh Savar County